Andy Cowan (born Andrew Glenn Cowan) is an American writer and script consultant for television and other media. He is the creator and host of the therapy/comedy podcast, The Neurotic Vaccine, launched in 2022 from Benztown + McVay Media Podcast Networks. From 2010–2011, he co-hosted his radio comedy therapy talk show, Up & Down Guys, on KPFK 90.7 FM in Los Angeles. 

In 2019 an Up & Down Guys podcast pilot was produced for Westwood One. He has appeared on several television shows, hosted the hour-long talk show pilot, Another Talk Show! with Andy Cowan, featuring Jason Alexander and Sheila Raye Charles,  and was guest commentator on KTTV's Good Day L.A. He has written humor columns for the Los Angeles Times newspaper and magazine, Salon, special material for The New Yorker, and several songs, one of which won international song contest nods. He is a voiceover artist, and sings in jazz clubs throughout Los Angeles.

Biography
Cowan received a master's degree in broadcasting from Boston University and began his broadcasting career in radio and TV news in Pennsylvania. Featured in the November 2018 edition of American University Magazine, it was there he received his bachelor of arts degree in psychology.

Career
After gaining media experience in Pennsylvania radio and TV stations, Cowan moved to Los Angeles, writing scripts for several comedy television shows. He gained greater exposure with The Merv Griffin Show during the 1980s, where he wrote, assisted in producing segments, and appeared on-air. He pre-interviewed hundreds of political, literary and entertainment figures, including Jerry Seinfeld and Orson Welles eight times up to his final TV appearance, deemed one of TV Guide magazine's 60 greatest talk show moments. For the cable TV channel Showtime, he produced, wrote and hosted the 1990 short 6 Minutes, a spoof of the popular 60 Minutes. That segment won a CableACE Award in 1991. 

In 1996 Variety named him one of "50 Creatives to Watch." At the 2009 Southeast New England Film, Music & Arts Festival, Cowan received the Best Comedy Award for the short film, Knocked Down, which he wrote and appears in. He was writing consultant on Prego, best comedy short film at the 2015 Manhattan Film Festival. Cowan has performed in comedy clubs throughout the country. His voice has been used on audiobooks for the Star Wars audiobook series, as narrator on the Audible Inc. audiobook, Tales from the Oklahoma Sooners Sidelines, and in TV show voiceovers, including as narrator on Hollywood's Best Film Directors. He has written for MyFM in Los Angeles and wrote for the Jack FM network from 2007 to 2010. He has written 300 panels for the award-winning worldwide syndicated newspaper comic strip Bizarro in collaboration with Dan Piraro, one of which was featured on NBC's Meet the Press, over 40 panels for the syndicated newspaper comic strip Rhymes with Orange in collaboration with Hilary B. Price, multiple panels for Harry Bliss'''s syndicated comic panel, Bliss, a panel and special material for The New Yorker, and several panels for the British current affairs magazine, Prospect, Reader's Digest Humor in Uniform panels, and Air Mail, a digital weekly newsletter launched in 2019 by former Vanity Fair editor-in-chief Graydon Carter and former The New York Times reporter Alessandra Stanley. 

Cowan's songwriting work includes ... Hitchin' on the Highway of Life (music, lyrics, vocals by Andy Cowan, guitar arrangement by Marty Rifkin, award-winning session musician for Bruce Springsteen, Tom Petty and Jewel) recipient of five international songwriting nods and featured in Knocked Down ... And 20th Century Man (music, lyrics, vocals) the theme to Another Talk Show! with Andy Cowan and Our Time is Up with Andy Cowan (host, writer, producer).

Cowan's television writing work includes "The Opposite", one of the top ten Seinfeld episodes.

In 2016, author/columnist, CNN anchor and SiriusXM radio host, Michael Smerconish, devoted a Sunday column in The Philadelphia Inquirer to Cowan's takes on Donald Trump's opposite approach to running for president, and interviewed Cowan on his SiriusXM show  about Trump possibly becoming Cowan's epitaph, for which Cowan, as reported in TV Guide TV Insider, apologized.

In 2017, Cowan received his first Marquis Who's Who in America.

His memoir, Banging My Head Against the Wall: A Comedy Writer's Guide to Seeing Stars, with a foreword by Jay Leno, was released on June 28, 2018. Media interviews included KCAL-TV CBS Channel 9; Los Angeles; KTLA-TV Channel 5, Los Angeles; KABC Radio, Los Angeles; WGN Radio, Chicago; The Michael Smerconish Program, SiriusXM; Coast to Coast AM with George Noory; The Michael Harrison Interview and The Adam Carolla Show on PodcastOne; The Jim Bohannon Show; and First Light on Westwood One. Banging My Head Against the Wall: A Comedy Writer's Guide to Seeing Stars was acquired in 2019 by The National Comedy Center in Jamestown, New York.

Credits

Partial credits include:Cheers (3 episodes plus an additional story, 1985–1987) – (writer)Throb (1 episode, 1986) – (writer)Take Five aka The George Segal Show, (6 episodes, 1987) – (writer, story editor)The Pat Sajak Show (1989-1990) – (writer, performer)Into the Night (1990–1991) – (writer)Seinfeld (23 episodes, 1994–1995) – (writer, program consultant)Double Rush (12 episodes, 1994) – (writer, story editor)3rd Rock from the Sun (16 episodes, 1995–96) – (writer, executive story consultant)The Merv Griffin Show 1981–86) – writer, segment producer, talent coordinator, performer)6 Minutes (Showtime, 1990 short segment) – (producer, writer, host)My Talk Show (1990, 1991) – (writer)The Best Damn Sports Show Period (3 episodes, 2002) – (announcer)Only Human (1990) (CBS pilot, co-writer)Barely Fitz (1998) (CBS pilot, writer)Howie (2000) (Fox pilot, writer)Knocked Down (2008 short film) – (writer, actor, vocalist)Ellen DeGeneres - (writer for 2001 Emmy hosting)Phonees (2011 webisode series) – (writer, actor)Up & Down Guys (2010–11 radio show, KPFK-FM, Los Angeles) – (creator, writer, co-host)Another Talk Show! with Andy Cowan (2011 pilot) – (executive producer, writer, host)Our Time is Up with Andy Cowan (2015 pilot) – (creator, writer, host)Wannabes (2016 pilot) – (Co-creator, writer, actor)Donald Trump is George as "The Opposite", The Michael Smerconish Program interview, SiriusXM, March 2016Is That Normal? with Andy Cowan (2019 comedy docuseries pilot) – (co-creator, executive producer, lead)Die Job (2019 dark comedy feature) – (writer)The Neurotic Vaccine'' (2022 comedy/therapy podcast) - (creator, writer, producer, editor, co-host, Benztown + McVay Media Podcast Networks)

References

External links

American radio personalities
American television personalities
Male television personalities
American television writers
Boston University College of Communication alumni
Living people
Place of birth missing (living people)
Year of birth missing (living people)